is a Japanese novel written in 1910 by Natsume Sōseki. This is the last work of the first trilogy, following "Sanshirō " and "Sorekara". It was a commercial success when published in Japan. This novel is about Sosuke, who betrays his best friend Yasui and marries his wife Yone, and how he seeks salvation from his guilt. Multiple English translations have been published, including a 1990 edition translated by Francis Mathy and a 2013 edition translated by William F. Sibley.  Pico Iyer wrote the introduction for the 2013 edition, which was published by New York Review Books.

Background
Sōseki did not choose the title Mon (The Gate). When Sōseki's publisher needed to announce the title for his next work, Toyotaka Komiya, one of Sōseki's pupils, chose the title at random from a nearby book, which happened to be Friedrich Nietzsche's Thus Spoke Zarathustra. The part of the novel describing Sosuke's retreat to a Zen temple mirrors Sōseki's own experience in Kamakura. Shortly after completing The Gate, Sōseki nearly died from an ongoing illness and its treatments, and his later works changed in tone and content.

Plot synopsis
The Gate concerns a middle-aged married couple, Oyone and Sosuke, who married for love in their student days. As the novel opens, they languish in ennui because they have no children and Sosuke has to focus on his career. Over the course of the novel it is revealed that Oyone was the wife of a former friend, and that Oyone and Sosuke suffered exclusion from society due to their ill-advised marriage. Oyone's ill health and a visit from Sosuke's younger brother provoke a familial crisis which becomes the central story. Oyone feels her childlessness was a punishment sent by the gods for abandoning her previous husband.

Major themes
All three novels deal with the themes of self-knowledge and responsibility – on the one hand, accountability to society, and on the other, responsibility to one's own emotions. However, the three novels do not share characters.

According to critic Pico Iyer, The Gate is a book "about what never comes to pass."The Gate focuses on detailed description of characters and setting, leaving the reader to fill in the blanks where action is left undescribed.  The action that is described is often portrayed as fruitless, or as making a bad situation worse. For example, Sosuke's trip to the Zen temple only teaches him that his efforts to seek enlightenment are unlikely to succeed.

External links 
 The complete text of Mon in Japanese.

References 

1910 novels
Novels by Natsume Sōseki